Trichoobscura is a genus of mites in the family Trematuridae.

Species
 Trichoobscura arrhenodis (Vitzthum, 1921)     
 Trichoobscura barbatula (Willmann, 1950)     
 Trichoobscura bifurcata (Hirschmann & Wisniewski, 1986)     
 Trichoobscura brunnei (Wisniewski & Michalski, 1984)     
 Trichoobscura calcarata (Hirschmann & Zirngiebl-Nicol, 1961)     
 Trichoobscura canadaobscura (Hirschmann, 1978)     
 Trichoobscura dialveolata (Hirschmann & Zirngiebl-Nicol, 1961)     
 Trichoobscura fallax (Vitzthum, 1926)     
 Trichoobscura gabonensis (Wisniewski & Hirschmann, 1992)     
 Trichoobscura granulata (Zirngiebl-Nicol, 1972)     
 Trichoobscura ishikawai (Hiramatsu, 1979)     
 Trichoobscura leucocelana (Wisniewski & Hirschmann, 1992)     
 Trichoobscura mexicodialveolata (Hirschmann, 1978)     
 Trichoobscura microcauponata (Hirschmann & Wisniewski, 1986)     
 Trichoobscura obscura (C.L. Koch, 1836)     
 Trichoobscura obscurasimilis (Hirschmann & Zirngiebl-Nicol, 1961)     
 Trichoobscura pecinai (Hirschmann & Wisniewski, 1986)     
 Trichoobscura perissopos (Hirschmann & Wisniewski, 1986)     
 Trichoobscura posnaniensis (Hirschmann & Wisniewski, 1986)     
 Trichoobscura punctata (Hirschmann & Zirngiebl-Nicol, 1961)     
 Trichoobscura punctatasimilis (Hirschmann & Wisniewski, 1986)     
 Trichoobscura rolniki (Wisniewski & Hirschmann, 1988)     
 Trichoobscura santana (Hirschmann & Wisniewski, 1986)     
 Trichoobscura schweizeri (Hirschmann, 1978)     
 Trichoobscura sibirica (Wisniewski & Michalski, 1984)     
 Trichoobscura solantei (Hirschmann & Hiramatsu, 1990)     
 Trichoobscura szaboi (Hirschmann & Wisniewski, 1988)

References

Mesostigmata